Clinical Imaging is a peer-reviewed academic journal on medical imaging. It was founded in 1977 and received its current title in 1989. It is published by Elsevier on behalf of the New York Roentgen Society.

History
The journal began publication in 1977 as Computed Axial Tomography. The founding editor was Rolf L. Schapiro. It was renamed CT: The Journal of Computed Tomography in 1978, and in 1989 obtained its present title. In 2012 it gained the sponsorship of the New York Roentgen Society.  the editor-in-chief is Elizabeth Kagan Arleo.

Abstracting and indexing
Clinical Imaging is indexed in:
 Academic Search Premier
 Biotechnology Research Abstracts (ProQuest)
 Compendex
 Embase
 MEDLINE
 Science Citation Index Expanded
 Scopus

References

External links

New York Roentgen Society

Radiology and medical imaging journals
Academic journals associated with learned and professional societies of the United States
Elsevier academic journals
English-language journals
Publications established in 1977